Southon is an unincorporated community in Bexar County, in the U.S. state of Texas. According to the Handbook of Texas, the community had a population of 113 in 2000. It is located within the Greater San Antonio metropolitan area.

History
Southton started as a station on the San Antonio and Aransas Pass Railway in the early 1900s and became a shipping point for the Yturri-Southton oilfield. A post office was established at Southton in 1910 and had only 16 residents that year. Besides the post office, Southton also had a church and twenty residents in 1940. Some businesses in the area included Bexar County Farms, San Antonio Cotton Mills, and Bexar County Boy's Home, a juvenile detention center. 90 people lived in Southton in 1946, with most of them practicing Lutheranism. It declined during the next two decades and had 60 residents and two businesses in 1965. It then returned to growth. Southton had 113 residents from 1990 through 2000.

Geography

Education
Southton had its own school in 1940. Today, the community is served by the East Central Independent School District.

References

Unincorporated communities in Bexar County, Texas
Unincorporated communities in Texas
Greater San Antonio